"Nobody's Fool" is a power ballad by American glam metal band Cinderella, released in 1986 as the second single from the band's debut album, Night Songs. It charted at number 13 on the Billboard Hot 100 and also at number 25 on the Hot Mainstream Rock Tracks chart in 1987.

Background

Singer Tom Keifer described "Nobody's Fool" as a "song for the falling out of love experience." He added, "And I would say that was not written for any one particular person. I'd been through that several times prior to writing that song. A lot of times, the emotions of songs are cumulative. That's not one particular experience, but the culmination of many."

Music video
The music video continues the storyline from where the "Shake Me" video left off, following the Cinderella-like girl as she accompanies the band to their rehearsal space, with the wicked sisters in pursuit. As the band performs the song, the girl runs home for the stroke of midnight when her rocker outfit changes back to a plain dress. She later meets the band again for an autograph, and the video ends as a glint of recognition passes across Tom Keifer's face.

Charts

References

External links
Music Video on YouTube

1986 singles
Cinderella (band) songs
1986 songs
1980s ballads
Songs written by Tom Keifer
Mercury Records singles
Glam metal ballads